Abu Halifa or Abu Hulayfah  or Abu Huleifa or Abu Haleifah is an area in Kuwait City, located in the Abu Halifa District of the Al Ahmadi Governorate in Kuwait
and since this area was rich in small plants called "حنيفا Hanifa", the name arose.
Abu Halifa is also a host to the Box Hill Institute of TAFE, the famous Kuwait Magic Mall and Sahel (Kuwaiti football club) Stadium.
Abu Halifa has major facilities ranging from mosques, restaurants, food courts, parks, walking tracks and pharmacies to malls, beaches and schools. Abu Halifa's population comprises a majority of Indians.

Abu Halifa Co-Operative society

The co-op society located near the Abu Halifa Police Station comprises some noteworthy stores like The Body Shop, Claire's and Payless along with the grocery section. It also has the bakery Saadeddin and Sable.

Recreation in Abu Halifa

Kuwait Magic Mall

Kuwait Magic Mall is a very good family mall with everything from indoor kids play area, a wide variety of restaurants like McDonald's, Zaatar, Shrimpy, KFC, Burger King, etc. and a large variety of clothing stores.
One of the main specialties of the mall is its outdoor play area, directed for a higher age group. It is a famous outdoor recreational park in Kuwait.
The biggest attraction of the mall is its beautiful sandy beach.
Kuwait Magic Mall was established in 2000 and covers an area of 2298 square meters in area. The area is divided into two blocks.

References

External links
Satellite map at Maplandia.com

 Suburbs of Kuwait City
 Populated places in Kuwait
 Port cities and towns in Kuwait
 Port cities and towns of the Persian Gulf